is a Japanese manga series written and illustrated by Yoshiichi Akahito. Premiering in Monthly Shōnen Gangan on April 12, 2005, the series centers on the "Corpse Princess" Makina Hoshimura, an undead girl who is hunting down 108 undead corpses in order to gain entry into heaven with the help of a secret society of anti-corpse Buddhist monks.

Feel and Gainax partnered together to adapt the series into a thirteen episode anime series. The first season, aired on October 2, 2008 on AT-X and finished on December 25, 2008. A second season, aired between January and March 2009. The anime is licensed for North American distribution and release by Funimation, which has released the episodes in subtitled form as Shikabane Hime through various online distribution companies and through its own website.

The series made its North American television debut on the Funimation Channel on November 15, 2010.

Premise
After being murdered, Makina Hoshimura turns into a living "Shikabane Hime" ("Corpse Princess"). Armed with dual MAC-11 submachine guns, she must kill 108 other Shikabane in order to gain entry into heaven. She is assisted in this task by Keisei Tagami, a Buddhist monk with links to an anti-corpse group known as the Kougon Sect. Her ultimate goal is to avenge the death of her family, by destroying the Shikabane known as the Seven Stars.

Characters

Main

 Makina appears as a sailor-uniformed high school girl with long purple hair tied with a red ribbon, and two braided pigtails that end in metal hoops. As a Shikabane Hime, Makina is tasked with killing 108 Shikabane to gain entrance to heaven; in the first volumes of the manga, there is a countdown of how many Shikabane she still has left to kill. She chooses to be a Hime in order to find who had killed her and her family. She has formidable physical skills, and her weapons of choice are two Ingram MAC-11 submachine guns. Her Contracted Monk is Keisei Tagami. Later in the story, it is revealed that her family discovered the process of making a Shikabane Hime and was killed by the Seven Stars who made Makina into a Shikabane. She is annoyed that Ouri keeps showing up at her missions, and often tells him to stay away from the action. But after Keisei dies, Ouri becomes her new Contracted Monk.

A high school boy who was raised at Keisei Tagami's temple. He treats Keisei as his brother even though they are not blood related. Ouri often appears where Makina and the Shikabane are by following a mysterious black cat that talks with him. The temple kids nickname him Hanagami (anime dub translation: "wussy boy"). Later on after Keisei's death, he becomes Makina's new Contracted Monk. At the start of the anime series, he moves from the temple to try to live on his own, and takes on part-time jobs.

Keisei Tagami is a Buddhist priest under the anti-Shikabane organization known as the Kougon Sect. He found Ouri Kagami as a three-year-old child and raised him at his temple orphanage. Keisei was an orphan himself, raised by Makina Hoshimura's father. When the Hoshimura family was brutally murdered, he agreed to become Makina's Contracted Monk. He is something of a pervert, often placing "pervy anime posters", "zenbu-nose" figurines, and dirty magazines in Ouri's possessions. At the end of the anime's first season he is mortally stabbed and then sacrifices himself to defeat Akasha. He then transfers his contract to Ouri.

Shikabane Hime

Anime and manga

 Sadahiro's cynical Shikabane Hime, who has dark hair and wears a light purple headband. She works at the bar that Ouri part-times at, and often hits Sadahiro to stop him from saying something stupid. Almost nothing is revealed about her past, except for her cause of death by a Shikabane. She fights using a sniper rifle. She is the only Shikabane Hime that is allowed to kill humans.

Isaki's Shikabane Hime noted for her green hair and her red butterfly hairclip that she wears on her left side. Her weapon of choice is a pair of knuckled gauntlets. She became a Shikibane Hime when she committed suicide after killing his boyfriend, and thinks that her existence is a form of punishment, although Ouri disagrees. She grows close to Ouri, but before a relationship could be formed, Isaki was killed; despite Sadahiro's offer to help her transferring her bond to Ouri, she ultimately allowed herself to be terminated rather than taking up the offer or reverting to a rogue Shikabane.
In the OVA of Shikabane Hime, Minai's past of how she became a Shikabane Hime is revealed. Minai was abused by her boyfriend and killed him with a knife. She then committed suicide in remorse by jumping off a roof. Soon after, she came to life as a Shikabane Hime and the Kougon Sect got hold of her. She was intended to be Keisei's Shikabane Hime but Isaki volunteered to be her Contracted Monk. From the start, there was doubt as to whether or not Minai could be a Shikabane Hime because her contract was incomplete. Isaki and Minai had to have a bond before the contract or else it would be meaningless. Sadahiro and Akira were both sent to investigate, and it was later revealed that Isaki didn't lie about his having a bond with her; they had indeed met in the past when they were kids.

Rika's partnered Shikabane Hime. Saki is a 10-year-old mischievous girl with blonde hair who enjoys teasing Rika by sharing Rika's romantic feelings about her colleagues. She is usually seen munching on chips or drinking juice, suggesting that her intense regrets and obsessions might be related to food. In the manga, her weapon of choice is a pair of axes, while in the anime, she uses a war hammer. Unlike other Shikabane Hime, her Contracted Monk happens to be one of the ten great holy families, which means that no ordinary Shikabane can defeat her.

Takamasa's Shikabane Hime with the very large pink bow at the back of her hair. She died in an automobile accident and came back with the regret of not living the life of a teenage girl. She bonded with Takamasa because she thought he was a powerful monk and would help her get to Heaven faster. Unfortunately, Takamasa knew nothing about the Shikabane Hime before that. Regardless, the two continued to work as a team. During their time, they began to develop romantic feelings for each other. However, they were unable to act on them because Itsuki was a Shikabane Hime. She fights with a pair of M945 Combat handguns. In the anime series, she joins Ouri's class as a transfer student, immediately trying to befriend him.

Takamine's Shikabane Hime. Nicknamed "The Sword Princess," Kamika has been referred to as the strongest Shikabane Hime not necessarily for the level of her strength, but her regret and will. She is typically seen wearing glasses and a button shirt like a secretary.

One of Umehara's Shikabane Hime is Flesh Backbone, who is as much an otaku as Umehara himself, although the two can have even more passionate arguments than normal Makina and otaku Keisei would have had over conflicts on two-dimensional vs. three-dimensional or doujinshi vs. figurines. In fact, she was a foreigner who had died in a plane accident on her way to Akihabara. The other Shikabane Hime of Umehara is Touma (who only appeared in the manga), who is away on a vacation of sorts and seems to strike fear in her Contracted Monk. She was the unknown female that was peeking outside Makina's cave, and she has brought news about her.

Manga only

A mature Shikabane Hime who only appeared in the manga with her younger partner, Sousetsu Kashio. She uses her whip to attack and tie down her enemies. Presumed to be dead.

A silent Shikabane Hime who is exclusive to the manga, her Contracted Monk is Takehiko Mutou, whom she agrees with his ideals of "killing Shikabane equals to salvation for their souls". Fights with a sniper rifle. Presumed to be killed along with Mutou and several others when they stayed behind to allow the survivors to escape from Hizuchi and Hazama.

The actual younger sister of her Contracted Monk, Jin Kisaragi. She uses a pair of sais in battle. She lets her body be ripped apart by Hazama in order to deliver a crippling blow. She was torn into shreds by an angered Hazama along with Jin, who stayed by her side till the end.

A quirky Shikabane Hime who always squabbled with her Contracted Monk, Nagatomo Kashin. She fights with a pair of sub-machine guns like Makina, she was the first to be killed when Hokuto decapitates her with a kick.

A flirtatious Shikabane Hime who would fight as long as her Contracted Monk, Hayashita Ayamitsu, said she could, as she is constantly craving for fights. She fights with a hand saw which she named "Britonian". She was eaten by Hizuchi after she lost her legs to him, but still managed to cripple him before that.

A young Shikabane Hime who is always seen wearing western clothes and a hat, she gets upset whenever her Contracted Monk, Hayatate Touto, starts his binge on alcoholic drinks. Her weapon is a chain connected to a shield at both ends, used to shield her allies from afar and could even be used as a flail. Presumed to be killed with the others.

Monks

The Contracted Monk of Minai Ruo. He has a shaved head with two slash marks on his left cheek. He is ambitious and aspires to advance in the Kougon Sect. He tends to order Minai around disparagingly. In the OVA it has revealed a little of his past and his hatred for his older brother. Isaki was made a contracted monk due to his brother's contacts. He intended to use Minai to kill his older brother, and claim the reasons that Minai killed his brother was because he was unholy and became a Shikabane. Isaki and Minai both knew they did not have a bond, but before Minai would turn into a Shikabane, he wanted to become higher status to be even higher than Keisei and even be the main monks, to bring down his brother. In the end, both Minai and Isaki accomplished to have a bond, but it turns out that they had a bond because they had a met a long time ago. In Isaki's family store, which young Minai went to frequently as a child. Isaki doesn't show compassion for Minai, but he actually did care for her.
 

 A monk that works in the Kougon Sect. He does not have a Shikabane Hime, but joins on the missions as the Inspector to observe the pairs. He is later called to observe Ouri to see that he isn't getting involved in the Sect's matters. Like Shuuji, he has a shaved head, but does not have slash marks on his face.

 The Contracted Monk of Akira Toooka, and is working undercover to keep an eye on Ouri and Keisei. At the start of the series, he is introduced as Ouri's boss at the Parthenon bar. He is a bit laid back. He was former roommates with Keisei Tagami and Akasha Shishidou.

Rika Aragami is the sole female Contracted Monk in the Kougon Sect. She has light short hair and often goes about her business with her shirt unbuttoned, showing her well-endowed chest in a black bra. She is a Gon Sojo who works at the district office. She is one of the ten Great Holy Families, which are the descendants of the ten senior disciples of the Founder and obligated to become Contracted Monk to a Shikabane Hime. 

 Known as the Traitor Monk, he was a former head in the Kougon Sect. He was in charge of the Suppression Unit but his squad was annihiliated and his Shikabane Hime was torn in two. A week later, he killed his Hime and stole some of the scriptures from the Temple. He believes that the Hime are being manipulated by the Sect into murdering their own kind. He gathers the blood of 108 people who have died and become Shikabane and uses that to invoke his advanced zadan techniques.

The Contracted Monk of Itsuki Yamagami.  Their relationship is a complicated one. While the two seem to have a romantic relationship, they are incapable of acting on their feelings due to Itsuki's nature as a Shikibane. Both he and Itsuki try to prevent Ouri from making a similar mistake with Makina, but at the same time their actions show signs that they want Ouri to prove them wrong. Takamasa often fights alongside Itsuki using a bow and arrow.  In the anime series, he joins Ouri's school as a new health teacher, and assumes the title of Genpaku in the Kougon Sect, the youngest to do so at age 19. 

 The Sojo (leader) of the district. The Contracted Monk of Kamika Tomoroki and the former mentor of Keisei Tagami.

The only Contracted Monk that has two Shikabane Hime. Although in the series, we only follow one of his Shikabane Hime, Flesh. The other's name is Touma. Umehara is known for his perverted nature. He does also have the reputation of being well versed in Shikabane.

Seven Stars
The Seven Stars are a group of seven Shikabane who work together for their common cause. They kill humans, other Shikabane and even oppose the Kougon sect. Each member has seven stars of the Big Dipper constellation carved into their skin. They were responsible for killing Makina and her family.

The 7th star of the group, appearing as a girl with short silver hair and a scar down the left side of her cheek. A special Shikabane who has no regrets, obsessions or even nature within her. Her death however, makes her one of the most dangerous, yet powerful undead being around. She was raised as a sacrifice, born to be killed as a child. She never experienced grief, pain, sadness or even happiness. Right after being killed, she is reborn as a Shikabane. She escaped with Hazama in the final episode, but is tracked down by Makina and Ouri. The series ends with her and Makina continuing their battle, with Makina saying that she will make Hokuto remember what it means to be alive.

The 1st star of the group. Hazama has giant centipedes for arms. At first glance, most assume that he was the leader of the Seven Stars. In reality, he is the right hand of the true leader, Hokuto. He is responsible for the ambush that led to the death of Akasha's Shikibane Hime. After his plan to use Hokuto to assault the Kougon Sect fails he escapes with her in the final episode.

 The 5th star of the group. Ena appears as a boy with green hair, glasses, and a yellow ribbon. He is able to possess a person by touching them. Ena was obsessed with beauty. His curse allows him to switch from one corpse to another, as long as they are nearby. When he was alive he was an artist who slashed his paintings, killed his models, and finally committed suicide. He was killed by Makina Hoshimura.

 He wears a white robe, a yellow vest and pants, and a large ball necklace. He is able to transform his body into a purplish gas so his weakness of a brain is not apparent. The 4th star of the group in the television series, replacing Izuwa. At the end off the first season of the anime television series, he gets the zadan technique Lotus Flower from Akasha, but he is eventually killed by Makina Hoshimura when she finds and the destroys the necklace ball that houses his brain.

The 3rd star of the group. Known for his ability to open portals.

The 4th star of the group. He is capable of killing via telephone communication. He was killed by Makina in volume 2.

The 2nd star of the group. Ouri's mother was responsible for his death. Hizuchi was determined to make Ouri pay for what happened to him. He was killed by Ouri and Makina.

The 6th star of the group. The most bizarre looking of the Seven Stars. She appears to be a man covered in a coat, but where a head should be, there is a cluster of balloons. Her curse allows her to manipulate the minds of people. She can also place balloons on people that cause their happiness to grow, until it reaches its peak. At that point, the person dies. It is revealed near the end that Toya was a little girl from a very poor family. One day, she and her parents suddenly went to an amusement park for a fun day before they committed suicide. As a result, Toya views death as happiness. She eventually questions herself about her happiness, causing her own balloon to pop and kill her.

Other characters

 Riko is the director and matron of the Dai-Rin House, the temple orphanage where Ouri and Keisei grew up.

 Ouri's classmate and friend who is a girl. She is serious and observant, and is involved in the student council where she aspires to become president next year. She often physically hits Hiroshige Ushijima whenever he acts girl-crazy. She is often seen with something in her mouth resembling a cigarette.

 Ouri's classmate and friend who openly expresses his love for girls.

 Ouri's classmate and friend. He is very innocent and oblivious to the world of Shikabane. He is on the kendo team.

A mysterious black cat spirit that appears only to Ouri to talk to him and to beckon him to follow it, leading to his encounters with the Shikabane and Makina. The cat also narrates the anime next episode previews. The cat resembles a pet kitten that Ouri cherished as a child which died after being hit by a vehicle. Makina is also able to see the cat. In later episodes, the cat reveals itself to be harboring multiple souls. Near the end of the series, the cat reveals its true nature with the help of a foe Shikabane who was once a fellow orphan along with Ouri. The cat was made up of a number of children who Ouri's mother had kidnapped trying to fulfill her attachment to this world: to hold her child in her hands. Later, the cat is revealed as a metaphor for Ouri actually being part Shikibane himself. it is not known how he became this way, but that after transforming into a Shikibane after realizing this, the separate entity that his subconscious had become, eventually fades away as well.

A classmate of Ouri, nicknamed Omune-sama or "Breast Goddess". In the first chapter of the manga she and a few other students visit a "man-eating house" where she is attacked and injured by a group of corpses. She is saved by Makina, and since then she has developed a fascination with her and death. In the anime, she is manipulated by Toya because they both thought death was beautiful. Toya's power transforms Kasuga, causing her to become more direct and eventually lead her to kill people at her school, until Ouri and Makina stopped her and Toya. However, they were unable to save Kasuga's life. With her last breath, she asked Ouri to make her into a Shikabane Hime. Her last wish goes unfulfilled as she didn't meet the requirements.

Terminology
 
Sometimes referred to as Corpses. When a person dies with a powerful regret or obsession, they may become a Shikabane. As a Shikabane, they are undead but retain some degree of memory and intelligence. They may appear to be human but often transform into monsters. Shikabane are given superhuman strength and a unique ability or attribute called a Curse. Shikabane have no feeling towards the living and tend to kill them as driven by their regret or obsession. A Shikabane can be killed by destroying their brains, or destroyed to the point where they cannot regenerate.

 
Shikabane Hime are Shikabane that follow the Kougon Sect and chose to reject their regrets and obsessions. So far they appear to have been young girls/women in their previous lives, and retain this human form. Each of them is partnered with a monk, who provides them with life energy called  that allows them to heal their wounds and regenerate. In exchange, the Shikabane Hime protect their partner. Their mission is to hunt and kill rogue Shikabane. Once they destroy 108 Shikabane, they fulfill their contract and can supposedly go to Heaven. Outside of Akira who was granted an exception, they are not allowed to kill humans. If their partner monk dies and a replacement is not forthcoming, however, the Shikabane Hime usually die or become a rogue Shikabane. 

 
Contracted Monks are the soldier monks in the Kougon Sect. They provide their life energy called Rune to their Shikabane Hime which helps her heal in battle. They also support her during battles.

 
The  head each of the districts. Keisei was promoted from Sho Sojo to Gon Sojo when he died in the line of duty. Genpaku, such as Takamasa Sougi, also travel to the different Sect's districts;

 Curse
A Curse is a unique power that a Shikabane possess. Generally, it has something to do with their obsession or regret. Some Shikabane have very strong Curses that are not easily defeated by the Shikabane Hime or the Monks.

 Inspector
A monk who acts as support for Contracted Monks. They usually do not have a contract of their own. They are also in charge of funeral arrangements of martyred monks.

 Shuhou and Shojou factions
 Two factions within the Kougon sect.  The Shujou faction is led by the Gon Dai Sojo, and does not like the use of the Shikabane Hime. Meanwhile the Shohou faction employs the Shikabane Hime.

Media

Manga
The manga was serialized in Japan from April 12, 2005 to August 12, 2014 in Monthly Shōnen Gangan. Individual chapters have been collected and published tankōbon volumes by Square Enix. The first volume was released on August 22, 2005; as of November 2014, twenty-three volumes have been released. A limited edition version of volume 17 including a drama CD was released in April 2012. Yen Press announced during their Anime Expo 2015 panel that they have licensed the manga in a digital format.

Anime

Produced by Feel and Gainax,  is a thirteen episode anime adaptation of the manga series. It premiered in Japan on AT-X on October 2, 2008. The episodes also air on BS11, Chiba TV, KBS Kyoto, Sun TV, Tokyo MX, TV Aichi, TV Kanagawa and TV Saitama. The opening and ending themes, "Beautiful fighter" and "My story", had a single release from angela on November 12, 2008.

The series is licensed for North American distribution and release by Funimation Entertainment which is releasing the series as Shikabane Hime. On October 24, 2008, the thirteen episodes began airing online with English subtitles through Funimation's official YouTube, Joost, and Hulu.com channels, with higher end downloadable versions released on the company's own website. Funimation noted that they hope this relatively quick release through online means will help prevent piracy. Traditionally, according to the president of Funimation Entertainment Gen Fukunaga, "by the time a licensing deal is signed to bring a series from Japan to the U.S. the episodes are already available as illegal downloads." On January 18, 2011, British anime distributor Manga Entertainment announced that they will release the first season Aka, on DVD in 2011.

A second season, titled , aired in Japan between January and March 2009. Episode 26 of the series, or Kuro 13, was released as a DVD only episode in August 2009.

Notes

References
Works cited
 "Ch." is shortened form for chapter and refers to a chapter number of the Corpse Princess manga.
 "Ep." is shortened form for episode and refers to an episode number of the Corpse Princess anime. "S2" refers to the second or Kuro'' season.

Other references

External links
 Official Square Enix Shikabane Hime website  (archive)
 Official MX TV Shikabane Hime anime website  (archive)

 Official Gainax Shikabane Hime anime website  (archive)

 

Feel (animation studio)
Funimation
2005 manga
Action anime and manga
Anime series based on manga
AT-X (TV network) original programming
Gangan Comics manga
Madman Entertainment anime
Shōnen manga
Square Enix franchises
Supernatural anime and manga
Thriller anime and manga
Yen Press titles
Zombies in anime and manga